The women's individual modern pentathlon competition at the 2018 Asian Games in Jakarta was held on 31 August 2018.

Schedule
All times are Western Indonesia Time (UTC+07:00)

Results
DNS — Did not start
EL — Eliminated

Swimming

Fencing

Riding

Laser-run

Summary

References

Results

External links
Official website

Modern pentathlon at the 2018 Asian Games